is a former Japanese football player. he is current goalkeeper coach J2 League club of Machida Zelvia.

Playing career
Takeda was born in Matsuyama on September 18, 1972. After graduating from high school, he joined Yanmar Diesel in 1991. Although he played as goalkeeper until 1998, he could not play many matches. In 1999, he moved to Vissel Kobe. He played as regular goalkeeper until 2000. However he could hardly play in the match for injury in 2001 and retired end of 2001 season.

Club statistics

References

External links

1972 births
Living people
Association football people from Ehime Prefecture
Japanese footballers
Japan Soccer League players
J1 League players
Japan Football League (1992–1998) players
Cerezo Osaka players
Vissel Kobe players
Association football goalkeepers